Ronald Victor Gemuseus Clarke (born 24 April 1941) is a British criminologist and University Professor in the School of Criminal Justice at Rutgers University–Newark. He is also the associate director of the Center for Problem-Oriented Policing.

Education
Clarke earned his BA in psychology and philosophy from the University of Bristol in 1962, and his MA in clinical psychology and PhD in psychology from the University of London in 1965 and 1968, respectively.

Career
Before joining the faculty of Rutgers' Newark campus, Clarke did criminological research for the Home Office for fifteen years in his native United Kingdom. He became the director of the Home Office Research and Planning Unit in 1982. At the Home Office, he helped develop rational choice theory in criminology and launch the British Crime Survey. In 1984, he moved to the United States, where he originally taught at Temple University. In 1987, he joined Rutgers University-Newark as the dean of their School of Criminal Justice, a position he held until 1998. Since 2001, he has been a visiting professor at University College London's Jill Dando Institute.

Honors and awards
Clarke has been a fellow of the British Psychological Society since 1978. He was the co-recipient of the 2015 Stockholm Prize in Criminology, along with Patricia Mayhew, in honor of their work in situational crime prevention.

Editorial activities
Clarke was the founding editor-in-chief of the anthology Crime Prevention Studies.

References

Further reading

External links
Faculty page

1941 births
Living people
British criminologists
Rutgers University faculty
British emigrants to the United States
Alumni of the University of Bristol
Alumni of the University of London
People from Tanga, Tanzania
Winners of the Stockholm Prize in Criminology
Temple University faculty
People from Millburn, New Jersey
Fellows of the British Psychological Society
People from Tanga Region